Capital Cities/ABC Inc. was an American media company. It was founded in 1985 when Capital Cities Communications purchased the much larger American Broadcasting Company. It eventually proposed a merger of equals with The Walt Disney Company and re-branded itself as Disney–ABC Television Group (now Disney General Entertainment Content) in 1996.

History

Origins
Capital Cities/ABC Inc. origins trace back in 1946, when Hyman Rosenblum (1911–1996), a local Albany businessman, and several investors, including future Congressman Leo William O'Brien and local advertising executive Harry L. Goldman decided to bid for a new radio station license in Albany. Rosenblum was also instrumental in help co-founding Hudson Valley Community College in Troy several years later, when he was on the Board of Trustees from 1953 to 1957 and then became the board's secretary in 1957, holding that position until his death in 1996. The company was incorporated as Hudson Valley Broadcasting Company on April 5, 1946.  when the company received the license for WROW radio in Albany, New York. In October 1953, it opened the Albany-Schenectady-Troy area's second television station, WROW-TV on channel 41. In the late fall of 1954, a group of New York City-based investors, led by famous radio broadcaster and author Lowell Thomas, bought majority control of Hudson Valley Broadcasting from Rosenblum and associates. Thomas' manager/investing partner, Frank Smith became the President of the company.

The Capital Cities era
In 1956, WROW-TV moved from channel 41 to channel 10 and became WCDA. In 1957, Hudson Valley Broadcasting merged with Durham Broadcasting Enterprises, the owners of WTVD television in Durham, North Carolina.  The new company took the name Capital Cities Television Corporation in November 1957, as both WROW/WCDA (now WTEN) and WTVD served the capital regions of their respective states. Capital Cities then began purchasing stations, starting with WPRO-AM-FM-TV in Providence, Rhode Island (another capital city) in 1959. In December 1959, the company's name was changed to Capital Cities Broadcasting.

During the 1960s, Capital Cities' holdings grew with the separate 1961 purchases of WPAT-AM-FM in Paterson, New Jersey, and WKBW radio and WKBW-TV in Buffalo, New York; and of the Goodwill Stations, which included WJR-AM-FM in Detroit, WJRT-TV in Flint, Michigan, and WSAZ-AM-TV in Huntington, West Virginia (serving the Charleston capital region), in 1964.  CapCities entered the Los Angeles market in 1966 with its purchase of KPOL (later KZLA and now the present-day KMPC) and KPOL-FM (later KZLA-FM and now KLLI). As a result of the Goodwill Stations purchase, and to adhere to Federal Communications Commission rules limiting ownership of VHF television stations to five per company, Capital Cities spun off WJRT-TV to Poole Broadcasting, a company owned by former CapCities shareholder John B. Poole. Poole's own Poole Broadcasting firm would later purchase two other television stations from CapCities: the second was WPRO-TV (now WPRI-TV) in 1967, coinciding with CapCities' purchase of KTRK-TV in Houston from the Houston Chronicle in June of that year.

In 1968, Capital Cities entered the publishing business by acquiring Fairchild Publications, publisher of several magazines including Women's Wear Daily.  The following year the firm purchased its first newspaper, The Oakland Press of Pontiac, Michigan.

The following year, the company made another big purchase—acquiring WFIL-AM-FM-TV in Philadelphia, WNHC-AM-FM-TV in New Haven, Connecticut (in another capital region), and KFRE-AM-FM-TV in Fresno, California from Triangle Publications, as well as its syndicated television unit Triangle Program Sales. Capital Cities would immediately sell the radio stations to new owners, and, so as to comply with an FCC rule in place then that prohibited TV and radio stations in the same market, but different ownership from sharing the same callsigns, changed the television stations' calls to WPVI-TV, WTNH-TV, and KFSN-TV respectively. The acquisitions of WPVI and WTNH gave them seven VHF stations, two stations over the FCC limit at the time, and WTEN and WSAZ-TV were respectively spun off by CapCities to Poole Broadcasting and Lee Enterprises not long after the Triangle purchase was finalized. After the sale was consummated, its syndicated unit was renamed to Capital Cities Television Productions. Charles Keller was named general manager of the unit. WSAZ radio in Huntington was divested to Stoner Broadcasting (it is now WRVC), also as a result of the Triangle deal. To reflect the diversity of their holdings, the company changed its name to Capital Cities Communications on May 4, 1973.

In 1974, Capital Cities bought WBAP and KSCS-FM in Fort Worth, Texas, along with its purchase of the Fort Worth Star-Telegram. The firm also increased its newspaper and publishing holdings during the middle-1970s. In 1974, Capital Cities acquired the Oregon-based Jackson Newspapers chain, which included the Albany Democrat-Herald, the Ashland Daily Tidings, and several other local newspapers and magazines.  The Kansas City (Missouri) Star was acquired in 1977, and the following year CapCities bought Times Leader of Wilkes-Barre, Pennsylvania.

In 1977, the company was a lead plaintiff in a lawsuit by the owners of Buffalo-based TV stations against the Canadian Radio-television and Telecommunications Commission over that country's simultaneous substitution rules. The Supreme Court of Canada ruled against the broadcasters.

Returning to broadcasting, WBIE-FM (now WKHX-FM) in Marietta, Georgia (near Atlanta, another capital city), was bought in 1981.  WROW radio in Albany, the company's first station, and its FM counterpart (which is now WYJB) were sold in 1983, and in 1984 the company made its last pre-ABC-merger purchases with independent station WFTS-TV in Tampa, Florida and KLAC radio in Los Angeles (concurrent with the sale of KZLA).

Capital Cities/ABC
On March 19, 1985, Capital Cities announced that it would purchase ABC for $3.5 billion, which shocked the media industry, as ABC was some four times bigger than Capital Cities was at the time. Berkshire Hathaway chairman Warren Buffett helped to finance the deal in exchange for a 25 percent share in the combined company. The deal was, at the time, the largest non-oil merger in world business history. However, this record would be surpassed by year's end by the merger of General Electric and RCA (the latter company then being the parent company of rival network NBC).

The newly merged company, known as Capital Cities/ABC (or CapCities/ABC), was forced to sell off some stations due to FCC ownership limits. Between them, ABC and CapCities owned more television stations than FCC rules allowed at the time. Also, the two companies owned several radio stations in the same markets. Of the former Capital Cities television stations, the new company opted to keep the outlets in Philadelphia, Houston, Durham, and Fresno. WFTS and ABC's WXYZ-TV in Detroit were divested as a pair to the E. W. Scripps Company's broadcasting division (then known as Scripps-Howard Broadcasting). WTNH and WKBW-TV were sold separately to minority-owned companies; WKBW-TV would eventually be acquired by E.W. Scripps by 2014. WTNH would have been sold in any event due to a significant city-grade signal overlap with ABC flagship WABC-TV in New York City. At the time, the FCC normally did not allow companies to own two television stations with common coverage areas (known commonly as the "one-to-a-market" rule), and would not even consider granting a waiver for a city-grade overlap.

The merged company could have been forced to sell off WPVI as well due to a large Grade B signal overlap with WABC-TV. Citing CBS' ownership of television stations in New York City (WCBS-TV) and Philadelphia (at the time WCAU-TV) under grandfathered status, Capital Cities/ABC requested, and was granted a permanent waiver from the FCC allowing it to keep WPVI-TV. Had the waiver request been denied, WXYZ-TV would have been retained.

WPVI-TV and KTRK-TV had long been ABC affiliates (in fact, two of ABC's strongest affiliates), while WTVD and KFSN-TV, longtime CBS affiliates, respectively switched to ABC in August and September 1985.

On the radio side, new owners were found for CapCities' WPAT stations (Park Communications was the buyer), WKBW (Price Communications, the new owner, changed its call letters to WWKB, which was necessitated due to an FCC regulation in effect then that forbade TV and radio stations in the same city, but with different owners from sharing the same call letters) and KLAC and KZLA-FM (to Malrite Communications), and ABC's WRIF-FM in Detroit (to a minority-owned concern), among others.

The merger was completed on January 3, 1986.  The new company retained ABC's radio and television combinations in New York City (WABC, WABC-TV and WPLJ), Los Angeles (KABC, KABC-TV and KLOS), Chicago (WLS, WLS-FM and WLS-TV), and San Francisco (KGO and KGO-TV), along with WMAL and WRQX-FM in Washington, D.C.; CapCities' aforementioned television outlets and the Detroit, Providence, Marietta and Fort Worth radio stations; Fairchild Publications; the Fort Worth Star-Telegram and the Kansas City Star; and other broadcasting and publishing properties. Orbis Communications immediately purchased the syndication rights to the Capital Cities production library.

In May 1991, Capital Cities/ABC's Farm Progress Cos. closed its purchase of Harcourt Brace Jovanovich Inc.'s 12-magazine farm publishing group. In 1992, Capital Cities/ABC sold Word Inc.'s music and book publishing to Thomas Nelson. In 1992, ABC launched its new home video unit ABC Video, which was headed by former Vestron Video employee Jon Peisinger. In February 1993, the company formed a television production joint venture with Brillstein-Grey Entertainment to tap into their managed talent and to take advantage of relaxed production regulations.  In July, CC/ABC purchased a majority ownership in animation studio DIC Animation City, forming a joint venture called DIC Entertainment L.P. Later in July, CC/ABC reorganized into 4 groups, ABC TV Network Group, CC/ABC Publishing Group, the CC/ABC Broadcast Group, and a newly formed CC/ABC Multimedia Group overseeing the network, magazines & newspapers, stations and new technology & miscellaneous operations respectively. Network Group president Bob Iger was also promoted to executive president of CC/ABC. Also in 1993, ABC launched a new video line Signet Video, which were designed to release feature films for theatrical release or telemovies. It was subsequently changed its name to Summa Video, and signed a deal with Paramount Home Video to handle distribution of the titles.

In 1994, CC/ABC agreed to a $200 million seven-year television production joint venture with the original DreamWorks live-action studio. Also that year, CC/ABC formed a partnership with Brillstein/Grey Entertainment to launch Brillstein/Grey Communications.

During the 1994-1996 United States broadcast TV realignment, the Fox Broadcasting Company agreed to a multi-year, multi-station affiliation deal with New World Communications. Unless Scripps told that they would affiliate the other three stations to ABC and threatened to flip WEWS and WXYZ to CBS, Capital Cities/ABC and Scripps-Howard Broadcasting reached a deal to affiliate five of the Scripps-Howard TV properties with ABC (WEWS, WXYZ, two outgoing Fox affiliates KNXV and WFTS, and NBC affiliate WMAR-TV), with one additional outlet received in a separate deal (CBS affiliate WCPO) in September 1995. As a contingency, ABC bought WJRT-TV in Flint, Michigan and WTVG in Toledo, Ohio from SJL Broadcasting in 1995. In a separate deal, Allbritton Communications purchased WCFT-TV and WJSU-TV, and made them full power satellites of WBMA-LP; this prompted Allbritton to sign a groupwide affiliation deal with ABC which caused WCIV and Brunswick sister station WBSG-TV (now Ion Television O&O WPXC-TV) to become ABC affiliates. The latter had joined ABC as a semi-satellite of WJXX, which replaced WJKS as Jacksonville's ABC affiliate upon its 1997 sign-on). In a separate deal, McGraw-Hill had to switch KERO-TV (channel 23) in Bakersfield, California; and KMGH-TV (channel 7) in Denver to ABC, and a renewal of the affiliation agreements with existing ABC affiliates WRTV (channel 6) in Indianapolis and KGTV (channel 10) in San Diego. This deal was made in response of the agreement stemming from NBC's acquisition of WCAU and the trade of KCNC and KUTV to CBS.

The Walt Disney Company announced that it would merge with Capital Cities/ABC in 1995. This merger of equals led to the formation of a new subsidiary, ABC, Inc., on September 19, 1996.

Structure at Disney acquisition
ABC Television Network Group
ABC News
ABC Sports
ABC Entertainment
ABC Daytime
ABC Children's Programming
CC/ABC Broadcasting Group
ABC Radio Network
eight TV stations
21 radio stations
ABC Cable and International Broadcast Group
ESPN Inc. (80%)
Eurosport (33.3%, England)
TV Sport (10%, France; Eurosport affiliate)
The Japan Sports Channel (20%)
A&E Television Networks (37.5%)
Lifetime Television (50%)
Tele-Muchen (50%, Germany)
RTL2 20%
Hamster Productions  (33%, France)
 DIC Entertainment (Limited Partnerships with Andy Heyward)
 DIC Entertainment, L.P. (100%)
 DIC Productions, L.P. (95%)
Scandinavian Broadcasting System (23%, Luxembourg)
CC/ABC Publishing Group
Fairchild Publications
Chilton Publications
multiple newspapers from a dozen dailies  and more weeklies
Ft. Worth Star-Telegram
The Kansas City Star
Belleville News-Democrat
Times Leader
Pacific Northwest Group
Albany Democrat-Herald
Ashland Daily Tidings
The Sandy Post
Lebanon Express
Cottage Grove Sentinel
The Outlook
News-Times (Newport)
The Oakland Press
dozens more publications in the fields of business and law trade journals
Farm Progress
Los Angeles Magazine
Institutional Investor
CC/ABC Multimedia Group
Creative Wonders (Joint-venture with Electronic Arts)

Former Capital Cities-owned stations
Stations are listed alphabetically by state and city of license.

Notes:
1. Two boldface asterisks appearing following a station's call letters (**) indicate a station that was built and signed-on by a predecessor company of Capital Cities;
2. This list does not include WTVG in Toledo, Ohio. That station was purchased by Capital Cities/ABC in 1995, and was completed just before Disney's acquisition of the combined group was finalized. In addition, WJRT-TV was reacquired in the same deal. However, in November 2010, Disney/ABC reached an agreement to sell the two stations back to previous owner SJL Broadcasting, which was completed on April 1, 2011; WTVG is now owned by Gray Television, while WJRT-TV is now owned by Allen Media Group.

Television stations

Radio stations

 All stations currently under ownership of Cumulus Media were previously owned by Citadel Broadcasting before Cumulus acquired the company on September 16, 2011. Most of these same stations were owned by the Walt Disney Company until Citadel's purchase of ABC Radio Networks and these stations on June 12, 2007 (except for WPRO-AM-FM, which were sold by Capital Cities/ABC in 1993 and acquired by Citadel in 1997).

Financial results

References

Bibliography
 

American Broadcasting Company
Disney acquisitions
Defunct broadcasting companies of the United States
American companies established in 1946
American companies disestablished in 1996
Mass media companies established in 1946
1946 establishments in New York (state)
1996 disestablishments in New York (state)
1996 mergers and acquisitions
Mass media companies disestablished in 1996
Companies based in Albany, New York
Mass media in Albany, New York